James Robert Tugman (born 14 March 1945) is an English former professional footballer who played in the Football League as a left back.

References

1945 births
Living people
Sportspeople from Workington
English footballers
Association football fullbacks
Workington A.F.C. players
Kendal Town F.C. players
English Football League players
Footballers from Cumbria